Mortsel-Oude-God is a railway station in Mortsel, just south of the city of Antwerp, Antwerp, Belgium. The station opened in 1836 on the Line 25. The station is partly in a tunnel, under a car park and road.

Originally the station was unplanned and the name was first given to the current Mortsel Liersesteenweg station, located on line 27. However, due to complaints by shop owners and inhabitants of the nearby Statielei, the NMBS built a new station on line 25 that received the name Oude God and the original station was renamed.

The current station building is a 1974 design from Dirk Servaes and Johan Beyne.

Train services

The station is served by the following services:

Intercity services (IC-22) Essen - Antwerp - Mechelen - Brussels (weekdays)
Intercity services (IC-22) Antwerp - Mechelen - Brussels - Halle - Braine-le-Comte - Binche (weekends)
Intercity services (IC-31) Antwerp - Mechelen - Brussels (weekdays)
Intercity services (IC-31) Antwerp - Mechelen - Brussels - Nivelles - Charleroi (weekends)
Brussels RER services (S1) Antwerp - Mechelen - Brussels (weekends)

Tram service
Tram service 15 serves the station, it is operated by De Lijn.

Bus services
Bus services 90 and 141 serve the station, these are operated by De Lijn.

External links

belgianrail.be
De Lijn website

Railway stations in Belgium
Railway stations in Antwerp Province
Mortsel
Railway stations in Belgium opened in 1836